Dicyclopentadiene, abbreviated DCPD, is a chemical compound with formula .  At room temperature, it is a white brittle wax, although lower purity samples can be straw coloured liquids. The pure material smells somewhat of soy wax or camphor, with less pure samples possessing a stronger acrid odor. Its energy density is 10,975 Wh/l.
Dicyclopentadiene is a co-produced in large quantities in the steam cracking of naphtha and gas oils to ethylene. The major use is in resins, particularly, unsaturated polyester resins.  It is also used in inks, adhesives, and paints.

The top seven suppliers worldwide together had an annual capacity in 2001 of 179 kilotonnes (395 million pounds).

DPCD was discovered as a  hydrocarbon among the products of pyrolysis of phenol by Henry Roscoe, who didn't identify the structure (that was made during the following decade) but accurately assumed that it was a dimer of some  hydrocarbon.

History and structure
For many years the structure of dicyclopentadiene was thought to feature a cyclobutane ring as the fusion between the two subunits.  Through the efforts of Alder and coworker, the structure was deduced in 1931.

The spontaneous dimerization of neat cyclopentadiene at room temperature to form dicyclopentadiene proceeds to around 50% conversion over 24 hours and yields the endo isomer in better than 99:1 ratio as the kinetically favored product (about 150:1 endo:exo at 80 °C).  However, prolonged heating results in isomerization to the exo isomer.  The pure exo isomer was first prepared by base-mediated elimination of hydroiodo-exo-dicyclopentadiene.  Thermodynamically, the exo isomer is about 0.7 kcal/mol more stable than the endo isomer. The exo isomer also has a lower reported melting point of 19°C. Both isomers are chiral.

Reactions
Above 150 °C, dicyclopentadiene undergoes a retro-Diels–Alder reaction at an appreciable rate to yield cyclopentadiene. The reaction is reversible and at room temperature cyclopentadiene dimerizes over the course of hours to re-form dicyclopentadiene.   Cyclopentadiene is a useful diene in Diels–Alder reactions as well as a precursor to metallocenes in organometallic chemistry.  It is not available commercially as the monomer, due to the rapid formation of dicyclopentadiene; hence, it must be prepared by "cracking" the dicyclopentadiene (heating the dimer and isolating the monomer by distillation) shortly before it is needed.

The thermodynamic parameters of this process have been measured.  At temperatures above about 125 °C in the vapor phase, dissociation to cyclopentadiene monomer starts to become thermodynamically favored (the dissociation constant Kd = ).  For instance, the values of Kd at 149 °C and 195 °C were found to be 277 and 2200, respectively.  By extrapolation, Kd  is on the order of 10–4 at 25 °C, and dissociation is disfavored.  In accord with the negative values of ΔH° and ΔS° for the Diels–Alder reaction, dissociation of dicyclopentadiene is more thermodynamically favorable at high temperatures.  Equilibrium constant measurements imply that ΔH° = –18 kcal/mol and ΔS° = –40 eu for cyclopentadiene dimerization.  

Dicyclopentadiene polymerizes. Copolymers are formed with ethylene or styrene. The "norbornene double bond" participates.  Using ring-opening metathesis polymerization a homopolymer polydicyclopentadiene is formed.

Hydroformylation of DCP gives the dialdehyde called TCD dialdehyde (TCD = tricyclodecane).  This dialdehyde can be oxidized to the dicarboxylic acid and to a diol.  All of these derivatives have some use in polymer science.

Hydrogenation of dicyclopentadiene gives tetrahydrodicyclopentadiene, which is a component of jet fuel JP-10, and rearranges to adamantane with aluminium chloride or acid at elevated temperature.

References

External links
MSDS for dicyclopentadiene
Inchem fact sheet for dicyclopentadiene
CDC — NIOSH Pocket Guide to Chemical Hazards

Cyclopentadienes
Monomers
Dimers (chemistry)
Cyclopentenes